The Kritser House in Independence, Missouri is a building from 1850. It was listed on the National Register of Historic Places in 1985. It is found as significant for being associated with the life of Martin U. Kritser, a person significant to the history and development of the town. It is one of the few middle class residential structures of the American Mid-Victorian frontier architecture period left in Independence.

References

Houses on the National Register of Historic Places in Missouri
Houses completed in 1850
Buildings and structures in Independence, Missouri
Houses in Jackson County, Missouri
National Register of Historic Places in Jackson County, Missouri